Tragedy, Rock Style is a 1988 Soviet drama film directed by Savva Kulish.

Plot 
The film tells about a young man named Vitya Bodrov, who is invited to court in the case of his father, accused of major fraud. Leaving the courthouse, Victor falls into the hands of Shaved...

Cast 
 Aleksei Shkatov as Viktor Bodrov
 Olga Alyoshina as Lena Kozlova
 Aleksey Maslov as Kassius
 Sergei Karlenkov as Genrikh
 Yuri Lazarev as Dmitriy Ivanovich Bodrov
 Tatyana Lavrova as Toma
 Valentin Nikulin as Dmitriy Ivanovich's Friend
 Albert Filozov as Dmitriy Ivanovich's Friend
 Boris Khmelnitskiy as Dmitriy Ivanovich's Friend
 Antonina Dmitrieva as Mariya Stepanovna

References

External links 
 

1988 films
1980s Russian-language films
Soviet drama films
1988 drama films